The Boston City Council is the legislative branch of government for the city of Boston, Massachusetts. It is made up of 13 members: 9 district representatives and 4 at-large members. Councillors are elected to two-year terms and there is no limit on the number of terms an individual can serve. Boston uses a strong-mayor form of government in which the city council acts as a check against the power of the executive branch, the mayor. The council is responsible for approving the city budget; monitoring, creating, and abolishing city agencies; making land use decisions; and approving, amending, or rejecting other legislative proposals.

The leader of the City Council is the president and is elected each term by the council. A majority of seven or more votes is necessary to elect a councillor as president. When the mayor of Boston is absent from the city, or vacates the office, the City Council president serves as acting mayor. The president leads Council meetings and appoints councillors to committees.

History
Prior to 1909, Boston's legislative body consisted of an eight-member Board of Aldermen and a Common Council made up of three representatives from each of the 25 wards in the city. When the Boston City Charter was rewritten in 1909, the Board of Aldermen and the Common Council were replaced by a nine-member City Council. All nine councillors were elected at-large for terms lasting two years. The new charter also gave the Mayor the power to veto all acts of the City Council. The first council meeting as a unicameral body occurred on February 7, 1910.

The procedure for electing city councillors was changed by Chapter 479 of the Acts of 1924, which provided for the election of 22 city councillors, one from each ward, beginning with the biennial election in 1925. The procedure was changed again by Chapter 356 of the Acts of 1951, which provided for the election of nine city councillors, all at large, for two-year terms.

In November 1981, Boston voters approved again changing the composition of the council, to 13 members: 9 district representatives and 4 at-large members.

District representation
The 1981 referendum establishing the current 13 member composition of the Council did not indicate how the district lines would be drawn, only that the districts be of approximately equal population and district lines not cut across city precincts.

The Council created a districting committee to propose several different possible district maps and hold public hearings before presenting one plan to the council to approve. State law required the City Council to make a final decision on the districts within 90 days of being notified that the referendum had officially passed, meaning that the Council voting on the districts would be the 1982 Council, not the 1981 Council creating them. Then-president Patrick McDonough, who opposed district representation, appointed Rosemarie Sansone, a major advocate of district representation, as chair of the districting committee, but chose Frederick C. Langone, Dapper O'Neil, and John W. Sears as the other three members, all of whom opposed district representation. Both Langone and O'Neil would be returning to the Council in 1982, but Sansone did not run for re-election in 1981 and would not be able to vote on the district boundaries if the committee did not work quickly to present a plan to the council before the end of the year. Public hearings over possible district boundaries were full of heated debate between advocates of drawing lines to protect neighborhood unity and advocates of drawing lines to create two predominantly minority districts and give minorities a voice in local government. Contention centered around Dorchester and the South End. Dorchester, Boston's largest neighborhood, needed to be split into at least two districts. A simple split in half would create either a north and a south district or an east and a west district. An east district would be largely White (75% or greater) and a west district would be largely African-American. North and south districts would have less extreme majorities. Many residents were opposed to both divisions, stating that they would increase racial segregation in Dorchester and continue the political powerlessness of minorities. A more complicated split taking into account areas with large minority populations would create one predominantly minority district and one predominantly white district but treat Dorchester as several smaller neighborhoods to be divvied up among surrounding neighborhoods rather than as one community. In various proposals, the South End, due to its location, was grouped with either South Boston or Back Bay/Beacon Hill by advocates of neighborhood unity, or Roxbury by advocates of minority-dominated districts.

Two days before the 90-day deadline, freshman councillor Terrence McDermott, who had been appointed as Sansone's replacement for chair of the districting committee, presented a plan to the Council which was approved 7–2 (the dissenting votes came from Raymond Flynn and Bruce Bolling). Today's district boundaries are only slightly different from those adopted in 1982, with the South End and South Boston forming one district, and Dorchester roughly split into an east and a west district. The Council faced more challenges after finalizing the new districts, such as whether or not district councillors should receive a lower salary than at-large councillors and where office space for four additional councillors could be found in City Hall.

Acting mayors
When the Mayor of Boston is absent from the city, or vacates the office, the City Council president serves as acting mayor. The city charter places some restrictions on an acting mayor's authority: an acting mayor "shall possess the powers of mayor only in matters not admitting of delay, but shall have no power to make permanent appointments." Three presidents of the Boston City Council have served as acting mayors of Boston for extended periods after the Mayor vacated the office:
 John E. Kerrigan served as acting mayor from January 1945 to January 1946, after mayor Maurice J. Tobin was elected Governor of Massachusetts. The Massachusetts legislature granted Kerrigan full mayoral authority. He sought election to a full term, but lost the November 1945 mayoral election to James Michael Curley.
 In 1947, upon mayor Curley being sentenced to prison for mail fraud, the Massachusetts legislature passed emergency legislation to bypass council president John B. Kelly, who had recently been acquitted on bribery charges and was in ill health, and granted full mayoral powers to city clerk John Hynes until Curley's release.
 Thomas Menino became acting mayor in July 1993 upon mayor Raymond Flynn taking the position of United States Ambassador to the Holy See. Menino served as acting mayor until he was elected to his first full term in November 1993.
 Kim Janey became acting mayor in March 2021, upon mayor Marty Walsh taking the position of United States Secretary of Labor. Janey was an unsuccessful candidate in the November 2021 mayoral election.

In June 2021, the city council granted itself the authority to remove its president by a two-thirds majority vote. Should that action occur while a council president is serving as acting mayor, the role of acting mayor would be assigned to the new council president who would be elected by a simple majority of the city council. In 2022 the rule was removed.

Membership milestones 
 First female member: Mildred M. Harris (elected in 1937 special election)
 First African-American member: Laurence H. Banks (elected 1949, not seated until 1951 due to legal disputes)
 First African-American female member: Ayanna Pressley (elected 2009)
 First Latino member: Felix D. Arroyo (filled vacancy in 2003, elected 2003)
 First Latina member: Julia Mejia (elected 2019)
 First openly gay member: David Scondras (elected 1983)
 First Asian-American member: Sam Yoon (elected 2005)
 First Asian-American female member: Michelle Wu (elected 2013)
 First transgender member: Althea Garrison (filled vacancy in 2019)
 First female president: Louise Day Hicks (elected president 1976)
 First African-American president: Bruce Bolling (elected president 1986)
 First Asian-American president: Michelle Wu (elected president 2016)
 First African-American female president: Andrea Campbell (elected president 2018)
 First Muslim member: Tania Fernandes Anderson (elected 2021)

Districts and current council

By law, Boston municipal elections are nonpartisan in that candidates do not represent a specific political party. However, most city councillors have been members of the Democratic Party. John W. Sears was the first Republican elected to the Boston City Council, in 1980. Chuck Turner, who served during 1999–2010, was a member of the Green-Rainbow Party. Althea Garrison, who served during 2019, has identified as an independent since 2012, but formerly served in the Massachusetts House of Representatives as a Republican.

Committees
, the City Council has the following committees:
 Standing committees

 Arts, Culture, and Special Events
 Census and Redistricting
 City, Neighborhood Services, and Veterans Affairs
 Civil Rights
 Community Preservation Act
 Education
 Environment, Sustainability, and Parks
 Government Operations
 Healthy Women, Families, and Communities

 Homelessness, Mental Health, and Recovery
 Housing and Community Development
 Jobs, Wages, and Workforce Development
 Planning, Development, and Transportation
 Public Safety and Criminal Justice
 Rules and Administration
 Small Business and Consumer Affairs
 Ways and Means
 Whole

Special committees
 Special committee on Charter Reform

Salary
The salary for councillors is half of the mayor's salary. Every four years, the Council votes on whether or not to raise the mayor's salary, thereby also raising its own salaries or not.

In June 2018, the Council voted to increase the salary of the mayor from $199,000 to $207,000, effective after the mayoral election of November 2021 (term starting in January 2022); this increased the salary of councillors to $103,500, effective after the council elections of November 2019 (terms starting in January 2020).

Presidents
(#) denotes different instances of a councillor serving as president

1. O'Neil was elected City Council president after the death of predecessor.

2. While Kim Janey served as Acting Mayor and was absent from Council proceedings, Matt O'Malley presided over the Council.

Presidents of the Boston Common Council (1822–1909)

Chairmen of the Boston Board of Aldermen (1855–1909)

Public records of Boston City Council
 City Departments' Annual Reports
 Complete stenographic machine record of the public meeting of Boston City Council
 Full text of Captions from Webcasts/Cablecasts of Boston City Council
 City Council page at boston.gov
 Publications of Boston City Council
 Communications of Boston City Council distributed by email
 Communications of Council Committees

See also
 List of members of Boston City Council, 1822–present
 Boston Board of Selectmen, 1630s–1822
 Boston City Hall, seat of municipal government 1969–present
 Old City Hall (Boston), seat of municipal government 1865–1969
 Suffolk County Courthouse, seat of municipal government ca.1841–1865
 Old State House (Boston, Massachusetts), seat of municipal government ca.1830–1841

References

Further reading

External links

 City Council page at boston.gov
 City Council Committee hearing transcripts at Boston Archives (index)

Government of Boston
City councils in the United States
Government Center, Boston